The 1994 South Dakota gubernatorial election took place on November 8, 1994 to elect a Governor of South Dakota. Republican former Governor Bill Janklow was elected, defeating Democratic nominee Jim Beddow.

Republican primary

Candidates
Bill Janklow, former Governor of South Dakota
 Walter Dale Miller, incumbent Governor of South Dakota

Results

Democratic primary

Candidates
 Jim Beddow, former Dakota Wesleyan University president
 Carrol V. Allen
 Jim Burg

Results

Third parties

Candidates
Nathan A. Barton (Libertarian)

General election

Results

References

1994
South Dakota
1994 South Dakota elections